David R. Prentice (born December 22, 1943) is an American artist.

Prentice was born in Hartford, Connecticut and studied at the Art School of the University of Hartford from 1962 to 1964, after which he worked for multiple esteemed artists including Jasper Johns, Robert Rauschenberg, Andy Warhol, Robert Motherwell, Helen Frankenthaler, Alexander Liberman and Malcolm Morley.

Prentice is an accomplished and internationally known landscape painter. He has exhibited his work in the United States and Japan. During the 1960s Prentice was associated with Lyrical Abstraction and his work was exhibited at the Park Place Gallery in New York City among other places.

External links
David R. Prentice Artist's website.

References

Living people
1943 births
20th-century American painters
American male painters
21st-century American painters
Modern painters
Artists from New York (state)
Artists from Hartford, Connecticut
University of Hartford alumni
20th-century American male artists